National parishes in Québec are Latin Rite Catholic parishes that serve the different ethnic communities in Montreal, such as the Irish, Italian, Portuguese, and Chinese.  They are distinguished from territorial parishes that serve the French-speaking majority, and also from Eastern-rite parishes that serve ethnic communities associated with Eastern Catholic Churches, such as Ukrainians.

Québec was first colonized by French explorers who brought to North America the Roman Catholic religion. English Protestants began arriving after the Conquest of 1760 and during the American Revolution (1776–1783). They established their own churches and charitable societies. The immigration of many Irish Catholics during the early nineteenth-century brought about a pastoral problem. No anglophone parishes existed in Québec at the time and few preachers could minister to the immigrants' spiritual needs. The Irish Quebecers successfully demanded the creation of English-speaking parishes. By the mid-1840s, they had also erected Saint Patrick's Basilica, a decade after the French Notre-Dame de Montreal Basilica was completed.

Thus came to be born the national parishes of Québec. This manner of church organization is unique in Canada. All parishes are in full communion with the local bishop. Parish boundaries are set by episcopal decree and the territories of the parishes of different nationalities overlap. Members of a certain ethnic or linguistic group in a given area are understood to belong only to their national parish. Thus, the English and French of one district may belong to two distinct parishes with the same territory. Nevertheless, no parish is officially subordinate to another (or bound by another's decisions), though certain have achieved greater renown than others.

English national parishes are quite numerous and are found throughout Québec. Parishes were also erected for the Italians, Portuguese, Ukrainian and Chinese communities of Montreal, among others. The oldest allophone parish in Canada is the Italian Madonna del Carmine ("Our Lady of Mount Carmel"), created in 1905 by Msgr Paul Bruchési. Alongside Madonna della Difesa ("Our Lady of La Difesa"), it enjoys particular prestige in the Italian community on account of its age.

Though Mass is celebrated in languages besides English and French outside of greater Montreal, no allophone national parishes exist outside this region—few allophone immigrants chose to settle elsewhere. Due to their smaller number, the territories of allophone national parishes are usually much larger than the territories of English national parishes.

Besides language, the national parishes keep alive through their celebrations different Church traditions and customs particular to certain countries, for instance, saints' feast days or devotional observances.  Many of these parishes are headed by priests who studied in or emigrated from those countries.

Catholic Church in Quebec